Gladiator-At-Law is a satirical science fiction novel by American writers Frederik Pohl and Cyril M. Kornbluth.  It was first published in 1955 by Ballantine Books and republished in 1986 by Baen Books.

Plot introduction
The plot is typically topsy-turvy.  Whereas in the authors' earlier novel The Space Merchants the world was ruled by advertising agencies, in this novel corporate lawyers, especially the secretive firm of "Green, Charlesworth", have gained a stranglehold on the world.  Business Law is an extremely lucrative career, while Criminal Law pays enough to afford some of the luxuries of life but not enough to save for the future.

Success means living in a luxurious automated "bubble home" constructed by "GML", a corporation which is nominally public but whose shares are never traded openly.  All work contracts include GML housing as part of the pay scale.  Not having a contract job means having to live in a community such as "Belly Rave", originally a post-war suburban development for returning soldiers, now a slum ruled by  gangs of teenagers and children.   Its original name was "Belle Rêve", which is French for "Beautiful Dream", in ironic contrast to the present ugly reality. 

For the common people, there are bread-and-circuses entertainments in the form of gladiatorial games of various kinds, with monetary rewards for the winners.  Some games pit elderly people against each other armed with padded clubs, but others are more deadly.

There are two main protagonists.  One is Norvell Bligh, a nebbish designer of game spectacles for a second-rank corporation who is thrown out of his job and his GML home, a victim of office politics.  His gold-digger wife, instead of leaving him, returns with him to her roots in the slum, kicking her daughter out to join a gang and bring in some money.

The other is Charles Mundin, an attorney scratching out a living in criminal practice, barred from more lucrative commercial work by the licensing monopolies of the large law firms.

By chance they encounter siblings Norma and Donald Lavin, who inherited 25% of GML stock from their father, the inventor of the Bubble House.  Donald placed the share certificates in a safe deposit box, and then was kidnapped and "conditioned", as are many common criminals.  He can no longer tell anyone where the stock certificates are, and any attempt to obtain duplicate certificates from GML will surely result in more foul play.

Helping the Lavins, they discover the truth behind GML and confront "Green, Charlesworth", whose true nature is more bizarre than anyone could imagine.

Plot summary
The action takes place in and around a future Monmouth City, New Jersey.  The city proper consists of luxurious GML bubble homes which can change shape at the whim of their occupants, and anticipate their every need.  At the edge of Monmouth City is the slum of Belly Rave, originally a gimcrack suburb built on a landfill and sold to unsuspecting young couples.

Charles Mundin and Norvell Bligh first meet when Bligh is trying to adopt his stepdaughter, mostly at the behest of his upwardly mobile wife, Virginia.  Bligh then returns to work on the next gruesomely spectacular Field Day to be organized by his company, while Mundin visits Republican Party headquarters, where he is introduced to the Lavins by his friend, the local Ward Chairman whose brother also knows Bligh.

Bligh finds himself tricked out of his job by his assistant, abetted by one of the secretaries who is keen to marry a man with a job whose benefits include a GML home.  Bligh is arrested when he tries to drown his sorrows, only to find his company credit card has been cancelled.  Mundin uses his political connections to have Bligh freed, but then Bligh and his family are unceremoniously dumped in Belly Rave.  Virginia is no stranger to the place, but Bligh needs the help of a local, who calls himself Shep.

With Shep's guidance Bligh negotiates the "public assistance" system which ensures that nobody starves, without actually making life worth living.  Shep scrapes together materials so he can paint "rainscapes", views of Belly Rave in the rain.  Other residents indulge in a kind of barter, or petty theft, extortion, and gang crime, or anesthetize themselves with liquor made from the desserts in their ration packs.  Virginia, opportunistic as ever, begins eyeing Shep as a replacement for Norvell.

Mundin eventually visits the Lavins, who live in a different part of Belly Rave, and meets Ryan, a broken-down corporate attorney addicted to "yen-pox", an opiate in the form of crude pills.  Ryan has a plan for recovering the shares which Donald Lavin hid away before he was brainwashed, but the initial effort at obtaining records from GML result in Norma Lavin being kidnapped.

Ryan is strangely elated, as it is evident that GML seems to think their activities are a threat, which could give him some leverage in negotiations.  He decides to send Mundin to a shareholder's meeting.  This entails buying a GML share on Wall Street, which has become a hybrid stock-market and public casino.  Mundin braves the touts and thugs of the market to trick his way to buying a share, normally impossible because of the activities of certain brokers.   Hiding out in Belly Rave, he meets Bligh, who has become adept in negotiating with the gangs there.  Bligh arranges Mundin's safe passage to the company meeting, in a deliberately obscure building on Long Island.

At the meeting Mundin, learning to play off the power brokers against each other, gains access to Norma, who is a "guest" of one faction. Mundin also gains an ally in Bliss Hubble, a "Titan of Industry" who sees in the Lavin's shares a way to unseat the faction currently in control of GML.  Recruiting a few more Titans to his cause, he takes the entire party to his elaborate GML bubble-house, which is currently configured as a Gothic mansion, thanks to a household servant with a grudge.

With Bliss's backing, Ryan and Mundin are suddenly a full-fledged law firm with expensive offices.  The plan Bliss hatches is to bankrupt GML rather than indulge in a proxy battle.  Mundin is dispatched to sabotage certain GML houses, including the model in the Smithsonian, at the same time spreading rumors through his political connections.  Bliss bankrolls some illegal medical treatment for Don Lavin, in order to reverse his brainwashing.  After this, they are able to recover the Lavins' stock certificates from a bank in Ohio, where GML was founded.

Norvell, meanwhile, is becoming an important man in Belly Rave.  His experience catering to crowds in the Field Days allows him to organize the otherwise listless residents to clean the place up and even try some local policing.  Shep, meanwhile, has become too close to Virginia, and Bligh has assaulted him with a piece of lead pipe.

At this point the much dreaded firm of "Green, Charlesworth" intervene.  They occupy the entire Empire State Building on the otherwise uninhabited island of Manhattan.  Rather than send their minions to shut down the plot, they grant Norma Lavin and Mundin an "audience" at their headquarters.  Here they are revealed to be a grotesque pair of ancient human beings, a man and a woman, trapped in husks of bodies in glass cases, but able to exert influence with their minds, their devices, and their money.  They own GML and have used it to rule their world.  They claim to be centuries old, having "fixed Mr. Lincoln's wagon" and they threaten to do the same to Mundin and the Lavins.  Mundin identifies them as the Struldbrugs described by satirist Jonathan Swift.

Returning to their offices, Mundin and Norma find that only Bliss Hubble and the increasingly comatose Ryan are still on their side.  They resolve to carry on regardless, but then chaos ensues as listening devices planted by Green, Charlesworth explode around them. In the confusion, Donald disappears, responding to a subliminal signal as if he is still brainwashed.

They find him at the Field Day, entered in an event where he walks a tightrope across a pool of piranha while under a hail of rocks from the crowd.  Despite their efforts at bribing the mob not to throw anything, aided by threats from Bligh's teenage gangsters, Donald falls into the pool.  Bligh is ready to sacrifice himself to save Donald, but instead the tortured artist Shep throws himself in with the fish.

Declaring war on GML and Green, Charlesworth, they return to Wall Street, where Mundin starts a run on the market by carefully selling off large chunks of the GML stock.  After a while the selling takes on a life of its own, despite the efforts of various people, acting unwittingly on behalf of Green, Charlesworth, to have Mundin arrested on trumped-up charges, or to discourage him from selling.

As the market collapses, the plotters are left with large amounts of cash, which they use to buy up GML and other companies at bargain prices.  At the end they are counting their riches and savoring their triumph, just as Green, Charlesworth, across the water in Manhattan, destroy themselves in a nuclear explosion.

Characters 
 Charles Mundin is not a particularly good lawyer, although he can easily out-think the likes of Wilhelm Choate IV, his friend who inherited a large corporate practice from his father Wilhelm Choate III and looks forward to passing the firm and its decades-long bankruptcy cases to his son, Wilhelm Choate V.   Mundin is fairly adept at cultivating political contacts, such as his friend Del Dworcas, the Republican Ward Chairman who steers work to him.  Del's brother Arnie is an Engineer, which in his case is more of a title than a vocation.  Arnie passes Norvell Bligh on to Del, who connects him with Mundin.
 Norvell Bligh is a Company man, eagerly organizing the bloody spectacles that keep his boss in business, though the boss chafes at being in a "minor league" operation and rides his workers hard to compensate.  At the beginning of the novel Bligh has to wear a hearing aid, but as he grows as a human being, he suddenly finds that he doesn't need it at all.  In parallel he frees himself from his fears of his boss, of his shrewish wife, of his fellow residents of Belly Rave, and finally of Death itself.
 Donald and Norma Lavin are the twin children of one of the two co-inventors of the automated, self-maintaining GML House.  Donald is naive and childlike as a consequence of being brainwashed.  Norma is typical of female characters by the authors, in that she resents the restrictions imposed on her by society, but is even more resentful of being attracted to a man like Mundin who does not treat her like a woman.
 Bliss Hubble is rich enough for money not to matter to him.  He is instead addicted to power and the pursuit of it.  Initially he sees the Lavins as another tool, but when he learns the true nature of Green, Charlesworth he decides that his "power" was an illusion, and sticks with Mundin and the Lavins after his partners bail out.
 Virginia Bligh, the once and future Belly Raver, is a survivor.  Sold by her parents, she was lucky to be merely a shill in a pickpocket operation instead of, say, a worker in a brothel.  Lying her way into a job as a receptionist, she entices Norvell Bligh into marriage, carefully editing her past to elicit sympathy.  She then persuades him to adopt her daughter Alexandra, creating a story of an abusive father.  Alexandra is well on her way to becoming an obese parasite when Norvell is outfoxed by his subordinate, who is also being manipulated by a Belly Raver, dumping them back into the slum.  Virginia kicks Alexandra out, telling her to join a gang and bring in some money.  Alexandra joins "Goering's Grenadiers", a gang of neo-Nazis.  Unfortunately their house is in "Wabbit" (another gang's) territory.
 "Shep" is a man in the wrong place at the wrong time.  Big and beefy enough to survive on the streets of Belly Rave, he wants nothing more than to paint.  He spends any money he gets on sending the local gang members to fetch paints from outside the slum.  He has entered the Games to raise money for painting, only to find that the emotional trauma of injuring someone to win the money prevents him from painting at all.  Virginia Bligh tries to entice him, but Norvell reacts by threatening Virginia and eventually Shep himself.  Shep, for his part, is too tortured by his inner demons to be interested in Virginia or to resent Norvell's hostility.

The GML House
A GML House is an invention, a "machine for living in" that brings together the "high technology" of the 1950s, these being plastics, electronics and cybernetics.  The house has movable walls, shape-shifting components and an "electronic brain" allowing it to adjust to its inhabitants' needs, even to cooking meals, and to be configured according to their whims.  It was created to satisfy a vision of housing for Everyman, similar to the Levittown ideal.

However, the inventors were unable to interest any corporations in building the houses to sell at a price the average person could afford.  The operation was taken over by a man named Moffat (the "M" in GML) who masterminded an operation which leased the houses to large companies to house their workers.  Eventually the lease arrangements began to include shares in the client companies, so that GML came to own major interests in almost every company in the world, giving it effective control.  In turn the GML house enabled companies to impose terms amounting to indentured servitude on their workers, the alternative being to live in a slum on public assistance.

Lavin was cut out of GML business and his stock was impounded on a pretext.  He died in poverty, but some time later a legal error allowed his children to regain control of the stock, whereupon Donald was kidnapped and brainwashed to prevent him from revealing where he had hidden the certificates.

Reception
Groff Conklin praised the novel as "a grimly unforgettable item that delivers an extra punch on a second reading."

References

External links

Gladiator-At-Law as serialized in Galaxy, parts 1, 2, and 3 at the Internet Archive

1955 American novels
1955 science fiction novels
American science fiction novels
Novels by Frederik Pohl
Novels by Cyril M. Kornbluth
Ballantine Books books
British satirical novels
Collaborative novels
American satirical novels
Gladiatorial combat in fiction